is a song recorded by Japanese singer Shizuka Kudo. It was released as a single through Pony Canyon on October 6, 1993. It made its first album appearance on the compilation album, Super Best, released later that same year.

Background
"Anata Shika Inai Desho" was written by Gorō Matsui and composed by Tsugutoshi Gotō. It marks Kudo's tenth single, out of twenty released at the time, to be co-written by Matsui and Gotō. It is the last song with lyrics written by Matsui to be released as a single, as well as being the last track of Kudo's to be co-written and produced by Gotō, notwithstanding the novelty single "A.S.A.P." (1997).

Composition
It is a slow, gospel-tinged rock ballad. Lyrically, Matsui describes a protagonist confidently professing her love and vowing to stand by her companion, whom she refers to as "the only one". The song is written in the key of G minor. Kudo's vocals span from F3 to D5. The song kicks off with a guitar solo and incorporates a soulful brass section while also featuring a backing choir harmonizing throughout the track.

Critical reception
Similarly to "Koe o Kikasete", also penned by Matsui and Gotō, the song is noted for its distinctively Western sound and southern gospel influences. Kudo was praised for the breathy tone she uses on the track.

Chart performance
The single entered the Oricon Singles Chart at number ten, moving 62,000 units in its first week. It peaked at number five the following week with 59,000 copies sold. "Anata Shika Inai Desho" stayed in the top 100 for a total of seven weeks.

Track listing

Charts

Certification

References

1993 songs
1993 singles
Rock ballads
Songs with lyrics by Gorō Matsui
Songs written by Tsugutoshi Gotō
Shizuka Kudo songs
Pony Canyon singles